Orkin Oркин (masculine), or Orkina Oркина (feminine) is a Russian and Eastern Yiddish surname that is likely an eastern variant of Arkin, but is not always a Jewish Surname. Notable people with the surname include:

Chloe Orkin, British physician
Dick Orkin (1933–2017), American voice actor and radio producer
Ivan Orkin, owner of Ivan Ramen
Ruth Orkin (1921–1985), American photographer, photojournalist and filmmaker
Stuart Orkin, American physician, stem cell biologist, and researcher